Ario Sagantoro is an Indonesian film producer.

Filmography
 Merantau (2009)
 The Raid (2011)
 The Raid 2 (2014)
 Zharfa (2019)

References 

Indonesian film producers